Sreten Stefanović (17 November 1916 – 18 February 2020) was a Yugoslav gymnast. He competed in eight events at the 1952 Summer Olympics.

See also
 List of centenarians (sportspeople)

References

1916 births
2020 deaths
Yugoslav male artistic gymnasts
Olympic gymnasts of Yugoslavia
Gymnasts at the 1952 Summer Olympics
Place of birth missing
Serbian centenarians
Men centenarians